Javier Retamozo is an Argentine hard rock and heavy metal keyboardist.

Biography 
He starts his career in 1988 with LZ2, a hard rock band led by Martín Knye. In 1989, he is chosen as the fourth best keyboard player of the Argentinian hard rock scene in the annual poll carried out by "Metal", a local magazine. After that, he takes part in Reaktor, where he records his first album "Reaktor" in 1990. Three years later, he leaves Reaktor to join Rata Blanca.

For the next five years, he devotes his efforts to record "Entre el Cielo y el Infierno" (Between Heaven and Hell) and "Rata Blanca VII" (White Rat VII), being the first recorded in Spain during an international tour which included The USA, Mexico, Portugal, Peru, Brazil... and sharing stages with legendary bands such as AC/DC, Megadeth, Ozzy Osbourne, Faith No More, among many others. In 1995 and 1996 he is chosen as "The best local keyboardist" by Metal magazine. After Rata Blanca's break up, at the end of 1997, he joins "Rivendel" a Queen Tribute band.

In 2002, he is invited to take part in another legendary band in their get-together: Alakran . In 2003, he creates "PERPENDICULAR", a Deep Purple tribute band. During that year, he is called on by Guillermo Sánchez (Rata Blanca's bassist) to take part in a brand new project: Mala Medicina.
In December 2007 he performed as a backing band member for a Graham Bonnet show in Buenos Aires. In 2008 he began working with Mario Ian (former bandmate in Rata Blanca) as a guest keyboardist, and remained in the band until 2012. In 2016, Retamozo joined Walter Giardino Temple South American tour, with Joe Lynn Turner in a tribute to Deep Purple and Rainbow. In 2017 tour South America and Europe with Temple, this time featuring Ronnie Romero from Rainbow.

Discography

With Reaktor 
 Reaktor – 1992

With Rata Blanca 
 Entre el Cielo y el Infierno – 1994
 Rata Blanca VII – 1997

With Mala Medicina 
 Mala Medicina – 2004
 A Pura Sangre – 2007

With Alakrán 
 Veneno Vivo – 2011 – (CD+DVD, live album)

External links 
 Mala Medicina's Myspace site
 Icarus Music

1972 births
Living people
Argentine heavy metal keyboardists
Rata Blanca members